Unwound is a live 3-CD set by saxophonist Tim Berne's Bloodcount which was recorded in 1996 and released on Berne's Screwgun label. The album was the label's first release following the demise of Berne's previous label JMT Records.

Reception

The AllMusic review by Joslyn Lane said "This is a great box set, recommended for all big fans of Bloodcount. The uninitiated should start with a smaller dose, such as Saturation Point or Discretion, since Bloodcount's music requires long attention spans (the tracks are over 20 minutes, on average) to reap the musical rewards". Writing for All About Jazz, Glenn Astarita stated "This is not easy listening for the faint at heart (although, it is less avante than one might assume). Bloodcount Unwound is a series of startling "live" performances by this tight and extremely adventurous unit. No place to hide here. It's difficult music to perform with plenty of surprises for almost everyone". JazzTimes correspondent Bill Shoemaker called it "a hard-core album, cubed".

Track listing
All compositions by Tim Berne

Disc One: We're Only In It for the Food  
 "Bro'ball" - 16:28  
 "No Ma'am" - 21:33  
 "Yes Dear" - 24:43  

Disc Two: An Average Daze  
 "Loose Ends" - 13:05  
 "Bloodcount" - 22:15  
 "Mr. Johnsons Blues" - 28:08  

Disc Three: The Fan  
 "The Other" - 28:31  
 "What Are the Odds" - 41:19

Personnel
Tim Berne - alto saxophone, baritone saxophone
Chris Speed - tenor saxophone, clarinet
Michael Formanek - contrabass
Jim Black - drums

References 

1996 live albums
Tim Berne live albums
Screwgun Records live albums